Lamar P. Fisher is an American politician who is a former mayor of Pompano Beach, Florida, serving from March 2007 until November 2018. He is currently the Vice Mayor of Broward County.

Fisher was elected mayor in 2007, running unopposed. In November 2018, Fisher was elected to the Broward County Commission. He was opposed in his election by Republican candidate Shari McCartney.

Fisher is also the CEO and President of Fisher Auction Company.

References

Mayors of places in Florida
Living people
People from Pompano Beach, Florida
Florida Democrats
21st-century American politicians
Year of birth missing (living people)